A tallit is a fringed garment worn as a prayer shawl by religious Jews. The tallit has special twined and knotted fringes known as tzitzit attached to its four corners. The cloth part is known as the "beged" (lit. garment) and is usually made from wool or cotton, although silk is sometimes used for a tallit gadol.

The term is, to an extent, ambiguous. It can refer either to the "tallit katan" (small tallit) item that can be worn over or under clothing and commonly referred to as "tzitzit", or to the "tallit gadol" (big tallit) Jewish prayer shawl worn over the outer clothes during the morning prayers (Shacharit) and worn during all prayers on Yom Kippur. The term "tallit" alone, usually refers to the tallit gadol.

There are different traditions regarding the age from which a tallit gadol is used, even within Orthodox Judaism. In some communities, it is first worn from bar mitzvah (though the tallit katan is worn from pre-school age). In many Ashkenazi circles, a tallit gadol is worn only from marriage, and in some communities it may be customarily presented to a groom before marriage as a wedding present or even as part of a dowry.

Biblical commandment 

The Bible does not command wearing of a unique prayer shawl or tallit. Instead, it presumes that people wore a garment of some type to cover themselves and instructs the Children of Israel to attach fringes ( tzitzit) to the corners of these (Numbers 15:38), repeating the commandment in terms that they should "make thee twisted cords upon the four corners of thy covering, wherewith thou coverest thyself" (Deuteronomy 22:12). These passages do not specify tying particular types or numbers of knots in the fringes. The exact customs regarding the tying of the tzitzit and the format of the tallit are of post-biblical, rabbinic origin and, though the Talmud discusses these matters, slightly different traditions have developed in different communities. However the Bible is specific as to the purpose of these tzitzit, stating that "it shall be unto you for a fringe, that ye may look upon it, and remember all the commandments of the LORD, and do them; and that ye go not about after your own heart and your own eyes, after which ye use to go astray; that ye may remember and do all My commandments, and be holy unto your God".

Encyclopaedia Judaica describes the prayer shawl as "a rectangular mantle that looked like a blanket and was worn by men in ancient times". Also, it "is usually white and made either of wool, cotton, or silk".

Traditionally the tallit is made of wool or linen, based on an understanding that reference to a "garment" in the Bible in connection with a mitzvah refers specifically to wool and linen garments. Though other materials are sometimes used, the debate has not reached a conclusion, and many, especially among the orthodox, prefer wool which is accepted by all authorities. There is also debate about mixed wool and linen tallit, since the Bible forbids klayim (shatnez) - "intertying" wool and linen together, with the two exceptions being garments of kohanim and tzitzit. Concerning tzitzit, chazal (the sages) permit using wool and linen strings in tandem only when genuine tekhelet (see below) is available, whereas kabbalist sources take it a step further by encouraging its practice.

According to the biblical commandment, a blue thread (petil tekhelet) is included in the tzitzit. However, for many centuries since the exile of the Jewish people from the Land of Israel, tzitzit have been worn without a techelet fringe, though in the last hundred years there has been something of a comeback.

Pronunciation 

In Modern Hebrew the word is pronounced , with the stress on the final syllable. The plural of tallit in Hebrew is tallitot, pronounced . The Yiddish plural is taleisim, pronounced .

Etymology 

Tallit is an Aramaic word from the root T-L-L טלל meaning cover. Tallit literally means cloak or sheet but in Talmudic times already referred to the Jewish prayer shawl.

Idiom 

In modern Hebrew idiom, the expression "a completely blue tallit" (טלית שכולה תכלת) means something which is completely perfect, and is typically used sarcastically to refer to a person who is imperfect and hypocritical. The expression stems from a rabbinic story about the biblical figure Korah who led a revolt against the leadership of Moses and Aaron. Koraḥ was said to have asked Moses a number of vexatious questions, one of which was, "Does a tallit made entirely of blue yarn require tzitzit?" To Moses' affirmative answer, Koraḥ argued that the tzitzit commandment is absurd, in that if a single string of blue makes a garment acceptable then a completely blue garment should be acceptable even without that string. Korach's argument in this story is a metaphor for the argument justifying his rebellion. Just as he argued that a blue fringe is superfluous for an entirely blue garment, in the text of the Torah he argued that a holy leader like Moses was unnecessary for a nation which was entirely holy.

The phrase "more kosher than tzitzit" is a Yiddish metaphoric expression (כשר'ער ווי ציצית) with similar connotations but is not necessarily used in a sarcastic sense. It can refer, in the superlative, to something that is really so perfect and flawless as to be beyond all reproach or criticism.

Customs 

In some Jewish communities a tallit gadol is given as a gift by a father to a son, a father-in-law to a son-in-law, or a teacher to a student. It might be purchased to mark a special occasion, such as a wedding or a bar mitzvah. Many parents purchase a tallit gadol for their sons at the age of 13, together with tefillin, though among the orthodox a male child will have been wearing a tallit katan from pre-school age. In the non-Orthodox Reform and Conservative movements in addition to the men, some women nowadays also wear a tallit gadol. While many worshipers bring their own tallit gadol to synagogue, there is usually a rack of them for the use of visitors and guests.

At Jewish wedding ceremonies, a tallit gadol is often used as a chuppah or wedding canopy. Similarly, a tallit gadol is traditionally spread out as a canopy over the children during the Torah-reading ceremony during the holiday of Simchat Torah, or in any procession with Torah scrolls, such as when parading a newly completed scroll through the streets.

The tallit gadol is traditionally draped over the shoulders, but during prayer, some cover their head with it, notably during specific parts of the service such as the Amidah and when called to the Torah for an aliyah.

In the Talmudic and post-Talmudic periods the tefillin were worn by rabbis and scholars all day, and a special tallit was worn at prayer; hence they put on the tefillin before the tallit, as appears in the order given in "Seder Rabbi Amram Gaon" (p. 2a) and in the Zohar. In modern practice, the opposite order is considered more "correct". Based on the Talmudic principle of tadir v'she'ayno tadir, tadir kodem (תדיר ושאינו תדיר, תדיר קודם: lit., frequent and infrequent, frequent first), when one performs more than one mitzva at a time, those that are performed more frequently should be performed first. While the tallit is worn daily, tefillin are not worn on Shabbat and holidays.

On the fast day of Tisha B'Av, different customs prevail. Ashkenazim and some Sephardim do not wear a tallit gadol during the morning (Shacharit) service; at the afternoon service (Mincha), those who wear a tallit gadol make the blessing on fringes then. Other Sephardim (following the Kabbalah and the prevailing custom (Minhag) for Jerusalem) wear the tallit at Shacharit as usual.

The Kabbalists considered the tallit as a special garment for the service of God, intended, in connection with the tefillin, to inspire awe and reverence for God at prayer. 

The tallit gadol is worn by worshipers at the morning prayer on weekdays, Shabbat, and holy days.  In addition, in many communities, it is worn by the hazzan (cantor) at every prayer while before the ark and by the reader of Torah, as well as by all other functionaries during the Torah reading.

History 

The literal commandment in the Bible was not to wear a tallit but to attach tzitzit to the corners of one's four-cornered garments every day to serve as a reminder of G-d commandments; this implies that such clothes were typically worn by Jews during biblical times. Such garments were large, white and rectangular and used as a garment, shawl and burial shroud. These four-cornered garments are suitable for the climate of West Asia. On hot days the garment could be draped around the body and head to provide cover from the sun or just bunched up on the shoulders for later evening use; the evenings can be dramatically cool and the garment could be draped around the neck and shoulders like a scarf to provide warmth.

Jews became at risk of losing this mitzvah when four cornered garments went out of fashion and became impractical for everyday wear. And so, a poncho-like vest undergarment was developed as a practical solution to continue following the Torah commandment. This garment is most commonly known as tzitzit, but is also referred to as arba kanfot ("four corners"), or tallit katan ("small tallit"). Jewish men wear the talit katan everyday, most commonly worn  under their clothing with the tzitzit knots hanging out. Some Jewish men prefer to tuck in their tzitzit to avoid drawing unwanted attention and/or for practical reasons. The tallit gadol became almost exclusively worn only for morning prayers and rarely outside.

Weddings 

In many Sephardic and German Jewish communities, the groom traditionally wears a tallit gadol under the chuppah (wedding canopy); in many cases, he will wrap it around the bride as well during the ceremony. In non-German Ashkenazi communities, a more widespread custom is that the groom wears a kittel. In Hasidic and some non-Hasidic communities, an overcoat is worn over the kittel.

Burials 

In the Diaspora, Jews are buried in a plain, wooden casket. The corpse is collected from the place of death (home, hospital, etc.) by the chevra kadisha (burial committee). After a ritual washing of the body, the body of men is dressed in a kittel and then a tallit gadol. One of the tzitzit is then cut off. In the Land of Israel, burial is without a casket, and the kittel and tallit are the only coverings for the corpse. Women are buried in white shrouds only.

Additional occasions 

In addition to the morning prayers of weekdays, Shabbat and holidays, a tallit gadol is also worn for Selichos in Ashkenazic communities by the prayer leader, even though it is still night. A tallit is also worn at night on Yom Kippur, from Kol Nidre, which begins during the daylight hours until after the evening (Ma'ariv) service.

Types of tallitot

Tallit katan 

The tallit katan (Yiddish/Ashkenazic Hebrew tales kotn; "small tallit") is a fringed garment traditionally worn either under or over one's clothing by Jewish males. It is a poncho-like garment with a hole for the head and special twined and knotted fringes known as tzitzit attached to its four corners. The requirements regarding the fabric and fringes of a tallit katan are the same as that of a tallit gadol. Generally a tallit katan is made of wool or cotton.

Although Sephardi Halakha generally maintains a distinct preference for a woolen garment as per the ruling of the Shulchan Aruch, among Ashkenazim customs are split, with the Rema ruling that all garment types are acceptable. Whilst the Mishnah Berurah and Rabbi Moshe Feinstein recommend wearing a woolen garment in accordance with the Shulchan Aruch's ruling, the Chazon Ish was known to wear cotton, in accordance with the ruling of the Vilna Gaon. This was also the practice of Rabbi Joseph Soloveitchik, and that of German Jewry historically.

While all four cornered garments are required to have tzitzit, the custom of specially wearing a tallit katan is based on a verse in Numbers 15:38-39 which tells Moses to exhort the Children of Israel to "make them throughout their generations fringes in the corners of their garments." Wearing a tallit kattan is not mandated in Biblical law, but in Rabbinic law the practice is strongly encouraged for men, and often considered obligatory or a binding custom.

The tallit katan is also known as arba kanfot (Yiddish/Ashkenazic Hebrew: arbe kanfes), literally "four corners", and may be referred to simply as tzitzit.

Tallit gadol 

The tallit gadol (Yiddish/Ashkenazic Hebrew tallis godoil; traditionally known as tallét gedolah among Sephardim), or "large" tallit, is worn over one's clothing resting on the shoulders. This is the prayer shawl that is worn during the morning services in synagogue by all male participants, and in many communities by the leader of the afternoon and evening prayers as well. The tallit gadol is usually woven of wool — especially among Ashkenazim. Some Spanish, Portuguese and Italian Jews use silk tallitot. The Portuguese Jewish community in The Netherlands has the tradition of decorating the corners of the Tallit. Today some tallitot are made of polyester and cotton. Tallitot may be of any colour but are usually white with black, blue or white stripes along the edge. Sizes of tallitot vary, and are a matter of custom and preference. Some are large enough to cover the whole body while others hang around the shoulders, the former being more common among Orthodox Jews, the latter among Conservative, Reform and other denominations. The neckband of the tallit, sometimes woven of silver or gold thread, is called the atarah which literally means crown but is often referred to as the collar. The tallit gadol is often kept in a dedicated pouch or cloth bag (often of velvet) which can be quite simple or ornately decorated.

The tallit gadol is typically either all white, white with black stripes, or white with blue stripes. The all-white and black-and-white varieties have traditionally been the most common, along with a blue-and-white variety, said to be in remembrance of the blue thread or tekhelet, which served as the visual inspiration for the flag of modern Israel. The all-white variety is customary among Sepharadic communities, whereas among Ashkenazic communities the tendency is toward white tallitot with black stripes. The stripes on the tallit may have their origin in the clavia, purple stripes which were worn on the tunics of distinguished Romans. One explanation for the significance of the black stripes is that their black color symbolizes the destruction of the Temple in Jerusalem and the exile of the Jews from the land of Israel.

In many Jewish communities, the tallit is worn in the synagogue by all men and boys over bar mitzvah age (and in some communities even younger). Aside from German Jews and Oberlander Jews, men in most Ashkenazi communities (which comprise the majority of Jews in America today) start wearing the tallit after their wedding.

Women 

In rabbinic law, women are not required to wear a tallit or other forms of tzitzit. The vast majority of contemporary Orthodox authorities forbid the donning of a tallit by women, although Moshe Feinstein, Joseph Soloveitchik, and Eliezer Melamed approve women wearing tzitzit in private, if their motivation is "for God's sake" rather than motivated by external movements such as feminism. At the gender-segregated sections of the Western Wall, women have been permitted to wear shawls worn around the neck — but harassed, expelled or arrested for wearing the more traditional garments outside the segregated men's section.

Women in non-Orthodox (Reform, Conservative, Karaite, Reconstructionist and others) are not prohibited from wearing a tallit, and usually encouraged to do so, especially when called to the Torah or leading services from the bimah. Women in Conservative Judaism began to revive the wearing of the tallit in the 1970s, usually using colors and fabrics distinct from the traditional garment worn by men, in the spirit of (but not necessarily out of adherence to) the contemporary Orthodox rulings regarding women not wearing "male-style" garments. It has become common in Reform and other non-Orthodox streams for girls to receive a tallit at their bat mitzvah, although some do not subsequently wear it on a regular basis. Other women have adopted the tallit later in life, including the larger, traditional style, to connect with their communities, embody egalitarian values, or create a personalized connection to Judaism. It is rare for women to wear a tallit katan.

See also
Christianity and fringed garments

References

External links 

 Tallit Blessing, tying, and customs

Hebrew words and phrases
Jewish life cycle
Jewish religious clothing
Jewish ritual objects
Shawls and wraps
Hebrew words and phrases in Jewish law